Skycovione is a COVID-19 vaccine candidate developed by SK Bioscience and the Institute for Protein Design of the University of Washington, It is South Korea's first homegrown Covid-19 vaccine and utilizes GSK's AS03 adjuvant technology.

The phase III clinical trial involves 4,037 participants. Should the trial confirm GBP510's efficacy and safety, the vaccine is expected to be approved in the first half of 2022.

In April 2022, results of the phase III trial confirmed the vaccine to be safe and effective. It elicited approximately three times more antibodies than the Oxford–AstraZeneca COVID-19 vaccine. Should the vaccine be approved by health regulators, it will be distributed via the COVAX program. The South Korean Government has ordered 10 million doses for domestic use.

The Korean Ministry of Food and Drug Safety released the results of their review on SK Bioscience's Skycovione on June 27, 2022 and said the data was sufficient for approval. According to the Korean Ministry of Food and Drug Safety, vaccine-related adverse events occurred in 13.3% of the vaccine group. In the control group, the adverse event rate was about 14.6%, which was not different from the vaccine group. Serious adverse events occurred in 0.5% in the vaccine group and 0.5% in the control group. There was one adverse event of glomerulonephritis which could not be excluded from vaccine association.

On June 29, 2022, Skycovione was approved for use in South Korea. The vaccine needs an additional safety review because "the number of participants in Skycovione's trial was only one-tenth of other vaccine trials".

In November 2022, the production of SKYCovione was indefinitely suspended because of short demand of the vaccine. South Korean government purchased 10 million doses of SKYCovione of which 600,000 doses released into hospitals. However only 3,787 shots of them have been administered as of November. Unused doses of the vaccine are likely to be discarded.

References

External links 

Clinical trials
South Korean COVID-19 vaccines
Science and technology in South Korea
Protein subunit vaccines